Gaydarbek Abdulovich Gaydarbekov (born October 6, 1976 in Kaspiysk, USSR) is a Russian boxer of Avar heritage, who has won two Olympic medals in Middleweight including the gold medal at the 2004 games. He qualified for the Athens Olympics by winning the 2004 European Amateur Boxing Championships in Pula, Croatia. Today he is perhaps best known for defeating future boxing superstar Gennady Golovkin in the 2004 Olympic finals. Despite his brilliant amateur pedigree, he never turned professional.

Amateur highlights
Russian Champion 1999, 2001 and 2002
1994 2nd place as a Flyweight at the Junior World Championships in Istanbul, Turkey. Results were:
Defeated A. Kopanov (Kazakhstan) PTS (15-2)
Defeated A. Mahdi (Algeria) DSQ-2
Defeated Borislav Nikolov (Bulgaria) RSC-2
Defeated Jesus Vega (USA) PTS (11-8)
Lost to Alexander Jimenez (Cuba) PTS (3-11)
1998 2nd place as a Light Middleweight at the Goodwill Games in New York. Results were:
Defeated Mohamed Hikal (Egypt) PTS (8-1)
Defeated Jermain Taylor (USA) PTS (13-9)
Lost to Juan Hernández Sierra (Cuba) PTS (5-16)
2001 won the Goodwill Games in Brisbane, Australia. Results were:
Defeated Utkirbek Haydarov (Uzbekistan) RSC-1
Defeated Paul Miller (Australia) PTS (9-5)
2004 won the European Championships in Pula, Croatia. Beat Lukas Wilaschek (Germany) in the final.

Olympic results
2000 Olympics
Defeated Utkirbek Haydarov (Uzbekistan) 11-10
Defeated Eromosele Albert (Nigeria) 19-9
Defeated Jeff Lacy (USA) TKO 3
Defeated Zsolt Erdei (Hungary) 24-16
Lost to Jorge Gutiérrez (Cuba) 15-17
2004 Olympics
Defeated Christopher Camat (Philippines) 35-13
Defeated Sherzod Abdurahmonov (Uzbekistan) 33-19
Defeated Hassan Ndam Njikam (Cameroon) 26-13
Defeated Suriya Prasathinphimai (Thailand) 24-18
Defeated Gennady Golovkin (Kazakhstan) 28-18

References

External links

1976 births
Living people
Olympic boxers of Russia
Boxers at the 2000 Summer Olympics
Boxers at the 2004 Summer Olympics
Olympic gold medalists for Russia
Olympic silver medalists for Russia
People from Kaspiysk
Olympic medalists in boxing
Medalists at the 2004 Summer Olympics
Russian male boxers
Medalists at the 2000 Summer Olympics
Middleweight boxers
Competitors at the 1998 Goodwill Games
Competitors at the 2001 Goodwill Games
Sportspeople from Dagestan